Postplatyptilia aestuosa is a moth of the family Pterophoridae. It is known from Argentina, Bolivia, Chile, Ecuador and Peru.

The wingspan is 17–21 mm. Adults are on wing from August to October.

The larvae feed on Oxalis tuberosa.

References

aestuosa
Moths described in 1916